Glen Echo is a neighborhood located in the far northern part of the University District in Columbus, Ohio. The area was listed on the National Register of Historic Places in 1997. The name Glen Echo refers to Glen Echo Ravine, which runs along the northern edge of the neighborhood. Principal streets in the area are Glen Echo Drive, Summit Street, Glenmawr Avenue, North Fourth Street, Arcadia, Cliffside Drive, and more. One street, Parkview Drive, was platted in the ravine basin, but was later abandoned.

The district originated in 1909 when the Columbus Real Estate and Improvement Company platted  as "Indianola Park View" for a planned residential subdivision and a part of the Glen Echo Ravine was delineated as a park, the first such donation to the city of Columbus by a real estate developer. The wooded Glen Echo Ravine significantly influenced the original layout, design, and overall character of the district. The neighborhood's developer was also involved with the development of Walhalla Ravine and Eastgate. Prior to its development, the area was considered for a major hospital; however, those plans were abandoned.

A 1909 Ohio State publication described the new north side park as a place of beauty where large oak and elm trees shaded a wading pond, five small lakes connected by a single stream, rustic benches, foot bridges and springs lined with cobblestones. Glen Echo's picturesque environs hosted picnic dinners, equestrians and motorists who enjoyed this oasis of greenery. In 1910 the development was annexed to the City of Columbus and in 1912 Glen Echo Park was dedicated to the city.

Most of the homes in the Glen Echo neighborhood were built between 1909 and 1943 and include American Craftsman style bungalows, Shingle Style, Tudor Revival and Colonial Revival, many with front and/or sleeping porches. Most homes, however are not "high style" structures, and would be classified as either traditional American Foursquare or American Vernacular in style. The homes are a mix of single and double units with a high home-owner occupancy rate. Grassy boulevards are features of Glenmawr Avenue and North Fourth Street; these elliptical islands are classified as parks with the Columbus Department of Recreation. Stone stanchions and street furniture are a hallmark of Glenmawr Avenue. The 1997 listing of the neighborhood on the National Register of Historic Places was made based on the neighborhood's overall fabric as a middle class development, rather than as a collection of high style architecture.

Homes in the neighborhood are kept in good repair. Residents have attempted to distance themselves from the now defunct Glen Echo South Civic Association. A move by some residents put the question of the neighborhood's leaving the University District up for discussion; however, the city of Columbus does not have a mechanism for detaching neighborhoods from one area Commission and reattaching that area to another commission. The neighborhood is currently working on creating an active civic association (Glen Echo Neighbors Civic Association or GENCA). Monthly GENCA governance meetings open to the public are held at 4pm on the Second Saturday of every month at the Glen Echo Presbyterian Church on Cliffside Drive.

The three interpretive signs located in Glen Echo Park along the vacated Parkview Drive provide walkers with insights into the history of the park.

Each year, Glen Echo Neighborhood is featured on Columbus Landmarks Foundation Walking Tour.

See also
 National Register of Historic Places listings in Columbus, Ohio

References

Neighborhoods in Columbus, Ohio
National Register of Historic Places in Columbus, Ohio
Historic districts on the National Register of Historic Places in Ohio
Historic districts in Columbus, Ohio
Old North Columbus